Sulebhavi  is a village in the southern state of Karnataka, India. It is located in the Belgaum taluk of Belgaum district in Karnataka.

Demographics
 India census, Sulebhavi had a population of 8159 with 4089 males and 4070 females.

See also
 Belgaum
 Districts of Karnataka

References

External links
 http://Belgaum.nic.in/

Villages in Belagavi district